Dato’ Zamzani Abdul Wahab , (born 19 April 1970) popularly known as Chef Zam is a Malaysian celebrity chef.

Background and education
Chef Zam was born and raised in Kuala Terengganu where he practised cooking in the kitchen with his mother since the age of 7 years old. He has a Diploma in Chef Training from Universiti Teknologi Mara (UiTM) in 1993. After that, he worked as a chef in several hotels before pursuing an Associate of Science in Hotel-Restaurant Management and a Bachelor's Degree in Hotel-Restaurant/Institutional Management both from Johnson and Wales University, USA. Chef Zam worked in New York for three years upon graduation. Then he returned to Malaysia and worked at KDU College since 1998. In 2003, he won a scholarship to study for a master's degree in Hospitality Management from Thames Valley University, London. After two years there, Chef Zam returned to Malaysia and returned to teaching at KDU College.

Career

He served as Lecturer, Senior Lecturer before  being promoted as Head of Special Projects at the renowned KDU College's School of Hospitality, Tourism & Culinary Arts, Selangor, Malaysia from 1998-2010.  During his 12.5 years tenure at KDU College, Chef Zam had led, organized and conducted numerous culinary-related events with students under his care.

He appeared in multiple television productions such as Garam Gula, Citarasa Selebriti, Ole-ole Malaysia, Serimas...Selera Dunia, Aroma Selebriti, Chef Selebriti Realiti TV (Suria TV, Singapore), Sajian Ramadhan 2008, etc. As a prominent Celebrity Chef in Malaysia, Chef Zam had also served as the Brand Ambassador for Philips Malaysia, Heinz ABC, Harvey Norman (just to name a few) and currently attached to BOSCH Home Malaysia. Besides that, he is working with a myriad of well-known brands on special campaign basis.

An avid foodie, Chef Zam always strives to have a better control of his TV show contents. To materialize that, he began producing his own TV cookery shows for local TV stations i.e. RTM, TVOkey and the likes.  To date, he has successfully produced a total of 6 cooking series, two Telemovies and counting.

Honours
  :
  Knight Commander of the Order of the Crown of Terengganu (DPMT) – Dato' (2021)

References

Living people
Malaysian chefs
People from Terengganu
Malaysian Muslims
Malaysian people of Malay descent
Malaysian television personalities
Malaysian television chefs
Alumni of the University of West London
Johnson & Wales University alumni
1970 births